Michael Hills (born 22 January 1963) is a retired British flat racing jockey. He is twin brother to Richard Hills and their father is racehorse trainer Barry Hills. He is now a BHA Jockey coach
Michael has a series of hobbies, such as darts and snooker, he also breeds Australian Finches

Personal life

Michael is happily married to Chris Hills and has a daughter- Samantha Totman (Nee Hills) 
Chris is Australian and the Racing secretary at Joseph Parr Racing.

British career wins
 1979 – 5
 1980 – 13
 1981 – 10
 1982 – 15
 1983 – 39
 1984 – 41
 1985 – 39
 1986 – 40

 1987 – 75
 1988 – 76
 1989 – 77
 1990 – 61
 1991 – 65
 1992 – 91
 1993 – 86
 1994 – 89

 1995 – 74
 1996 – 80
 1997 – 84
 1998 – 61
 1999 – 92
 2000 – 73
 2001 – 58
 2002 – 65

 2003 – 57
 2004 – 66
 2005 – 56
 2006 – 69
 2007 – 50
 2008 – 47
 2009 – 57

Major wins
 Great Britain
 Ascot Gold Cup – (1) – Arcadian Heights (1994)
 Champion Stakes – (1) – Storming Home (2002)
 Coronation Stakes – (2) – Rebecca Sharp (1997), Maids Causeway (2005)
 Derby – (1) – Shaamit (1996)
 Dewhurst Stakes – (4) – Huntingdale (1985), Scenic (1988, dead heat), In Command (1996), Distant Music (1999)
 Fillies' Mile – (1) – Silk Slippers (1989)
 Golden Jubilee Stakes – (2) – Owington (1994), Royal Applause (1997)
 Haydock Sprint Cup – (2) – Royal Applause (1997), Red Clubs (2007)
 King George VI and Queen Elizabeth Stakes – (1) – Pentire (1996)
 King's Stand Stakes – (1) – Equiano (2010)
 Lockinge Stakes – (1) – First Island (1997)
 Middle Park Stakes – (2) – First Trump (1993), Dark Angel (2007)
 Nassau Stakes – (1) – Ryafan (1997)
 Nunthorpe Stakes – (2) – Handsome Sailor (1988), La Cucaracha (2005)
 Prince of Wales's Stakes – (1) – First Island (1996)
 Queen Anne Stakes – (1) – Nicolotte (1995)
 Sun Chariot Stakes – (1) – Spinning Queen (2006)
 Sussex Stakes – (1) – First Island (1996)

 France
 Prix de l'Abbaye de Longchamp – (1) – Handsome Sailor (1988)
 Prix d'Ispahan – (1) – Sasuru (1997)
 Prix Jean Prat – (1) – Golden Snake (1999)
 Prix Morny – (1) – Hoh Magic (1994)

 Hong Kong Cup – (1) – First Island (1996)

 Ireland
 Irish 1,000 Guineas – (2) – Nicer (1993), Hula Angel (1999)
 Irish Champion Stakes – (1) – Pentire (1995)
 Matron Stakes – (1) – Pixie Erin (1987)
 National Stakes – (1) – Lockton (1986)
 Pretty Polly Stakes – (1) – Lady Upstage (2000)

 Italy
 Premio Vittorio di Capua – (1) – Nicolotte (1995)

 United Arab Emirates
 Dubai Golden Shaheen – (1) – State City (2003)

India
 The Clash of the Titans Thumbelina Trophy – (1)
- Bonjour Tristesse (2000)

See also
List of jockeys

References

1963 births
English jockeys
Living people
People educated at Cokethorpe School
Lester Award winners
British Champion apprentice jockeys
Twin sportspeople